Jan Pęczek (21 August 1950 – 27 July 2021) was a Polish actor, known for the role of Zenon Grzelak in the TVP2 series Barwy szczęścia.

Career
In 1974 Pęczek graduated from the Acting Department of AST National Academy of Theatre Arts in Kraków. He was associated, inter alia, with the Pomeranian Region Theater in Grudziądz, the Stefan Jaracz Theater in Olsztyn, the Silesian Theatre in Katowice, the Popular Theater in Warsaw. From 1982 till his death in 2021 he was an actor of the Współczesny Theater.

Personal life
His wife was Jadwiga Bargiełowska-Pęczek, she died two months before him. They had three children and seven grandchildren.

Death
He died on 27 July 2021 of a bone marrow cancer, aged 70. The funeral Mass was celebrated on 13 August 2021 in the Church of St. Catherine in Warsaw. He was buried on the same day at the Służew Old Cemetery.

References

External links
 

1950 births
2021 deaths
20th-century Polish male actors
21st-century Polish male actors
Polish male film actors
Polish male stage actors
Burials at Służew Old Cemetery
People from Maków Podhalański